Ike Isaacs  (December 1, 1919, Rangoon, Burma – January 11, 1996, Sydney, Australia) was a Burmese-English jazz guitarist, best known for his work with violinist Stéphane Grappelli.

Isaacs was self-taught on guitar. He started playing professionally in college while pursuing a degree in chemistry. In 1946 he moved to England, where he became a member of the BBC Show Band. During the 1960s and 1970s, he was a member of the Hot Club of London, led by guitarist Diz Disley, which often collaborated with Stéphane Grappelli. He was a member of the band Velvet with Digby Fairweather, Len Skeat, and Denny Wright. In the 1980s, he moved to Australia and taught at the Sydney School of Guitar.

He died of cancer in January 1996, at the age of 76.

Discography

As sideman
With Stéphane Grappelli
 1975: Violinspiration, Diz Disley Trio with Stéphane Grappelli
 1990: Compact Jazz: Jean-Luc Ponty & Stephane Grappelli
 1990: Shades of Django
 1999: Menuhin & Grappelli Play Gershwin, Berlin, Kern, Porter, Rodgers & Hart and Others, Stéphane Grappelli and Yehudi Menuhin

With others
 1958: Our Kind of Jazz, Ted Heath
 1968: Hair Is Beautiful, Barney Kessel
 2004: Thunderbirds 2 (soundtrack), Barry Gray
 2006: Jake in a Box: The EMI Recordings 1967–1976, Jake Thackray
 2006: Sketches: A Tribute to Art Tatum, Martin Taylor
 2011: Three Classic Albums Plus: Showcase/Little Klunk/Jazz Inc., Stan Tracey

References

1919 births
1996 deaths
People from Yangon
20th-century British guitarists
21st-century British guitarists
English jazz guitarists
English male guitarists
British people in British Burma
20th-century British male musicians
21st-century British male musicians
British male jazz musicians
British emigrants to Australia